Antti Johannes Rantamaa (26 November 1904 Merikarvia, Finland – 17 August 1987 Switzerland) was a Finnish priest, member of the Finnish Parliament, figure of the Winter War, and author. He was one of the heads of the Evangelical Lutheran Church of Finland.

Rantamaa is famous as the chaplain in the Finnish postcard depicting Christmas devotions said to have taken place in 1939 under enemy fire, causing it to cease.

See also
 Edgar van Tuyll, grandson of Antti Johannes Rantamaa
 Simo Häyhä, a Finnish sniper and Winter War veteran, who served in the same company as Rantamaa
 Aarne Juutilainen, a famous figure of the Winter War, who also served in the same company as Rantamaa

References
Kuka Kukin on - Who's who in Finland, Otava

1904 births
1987 deaths
People from Merikarvia
People from Turku and Pori Province (Grand Duchy of Finland)
20th-century Finnish Lutheran clergy
Centre Party (Finland) politicians
Members of the Parliament of Finland (1939–45)
Members of the Parliament of Finland (1945–48)
Members of the Parliament of Finland (1948–51)
Members of the Parliament of Finland (1951–54)
Members of the Parliament of Finland (1954–58)
Members of the Parliament of Finland (1958–62)
Finnish military chaplains
World War II chaplains
Finnish military personnel of World War II
Postcards
University of Helsinki alumni